Dave Newman is a former award winning Canadian Football League wide receiver.

Newman played his college football at University of Missouri. In his first CFL season, with the Toronto Argonauts, he caught 50 passes for 823 yards and 10 touchdowns, winning him the Frank M. Gibson Trophy as top rookie in the CFL East and an All-Star selection. He later played with the Ottawa Rough Riders. After 6 seasons he retired having caught 196 passes for 3145 yards and 35 touchdowns (one on a punt return).

References

Toronto Argonauts players
Ottawa Rough Riders players
American players of Canadian football
1956 births
Living people
Missouri Tigers football players
Canadian Football League Rookie of the Year Award winners